Ignatius Loyola Mascarenhas  (3 June 1949) is an Indian prelate of the Roman Catholic Church.

Mascarenhas was born in Mangalore, India. He was ordained a priest on 17 December 1977. He was appointed bishop to the Diocese of Simla and Chandigarh on 10 February 2009, and ordained bishop on 3 April 2009. Mascarenhas is till date bishop of the Chandigarh and Simla Diocese.

References

External links 
Catholic-Hierarchy

21st-century Roman Catholic bishops in India
1949 births
Living people